The Ministry of Power and Energy is a cabinet ministry of the Government of Sri Lanka responsible for power and renewable energy. The ministry is responsible for formulating and implementing national policy on power and renewable energy and other subjects which come under its purview.

, the current Minister of Power and Energy is Kanchana Wijesekera. The ministry's secretary is (Ms) Wasantha Perera.

Ministers

Secretaries

See also
Electricity sector in Sri Lanka
India–Sri Lanka HVDC Interconnection
List of power stations in Sri Lanka

References

External links
 powermin.gov.lk

Power and Energy
Sri Lanka
Power and Energy